Laura Lee Dockrill (born 28 May 1986) is an English author and performance poet.

Personal life
Dockrill is married to musician Hugo White (from The Maccabees); they have a son, after whose birth Dockrill suffered severe postpartum depression.

Books 

Mistakes in the Background (HarperCollins, 2008)
Ugly Shy Girl (HarperCollins, 2009)
Echoes (HarperCollins, 2010)
What Have I Done? Motherhood, Mental illness & Me (Square Peg, 2020)

Children's books 

Darcy Burdock (2013)
Lorali (Hot Key Books, 2015)
Aurabel (Hot Key Books, 2017)
My Mum's Growing Down (Faber & Faber, 2017)
Big Bones (Hot Key Books, 2018)
Angry Cookie (Walker Books, 2018)
Robin Hood (Samuel French, 2018)
My ideal boyfriend is a croissant (2019)
Sequin and Stitch (Barrington Stoke, 2020)
Butterfly Brain (Templar Publishing, 2020)
The Lipstick (Walker Books, 2021)

References

External links 
Laura Dockrill – interview (The Guardian)
Laura Dockrill (HarperCollins)
Laura Dockrill (BBC Radio)

Living people
Date of birth missing (living people)
English women poets
1986 births